Frank Parker defeated Bill Talbert 6–4, 3–6, 6–3, 6–3 in the final to win the men's singles tennis title at the 1944 U.S. National Championships.

Seeds
The tournament used two lists of players for seeding the men's singles event; one for U.S. players or foreign players resident in the U.S., and one for foreign players not resident in the U.S. Frank Parker is the champion; others show the round in which they were eliminated.

U.S.
  Pancho Segura (semifinals)
  Donald McNeill (semifinals)
  Bill Talbert (finalist)
  Frank Parker (champion)
  Seymour Greenberg (quarterfinals)
  Robert Falkenburg (quarterfinals)
  Sidney Wood (first round)
  Jack Jossi (second round)

Foreign
  Armando Vega (first round)
  Rolando Vega (second round)

Draw

Key
 Q = Qualifier
 WC = Wild card
 LL = Lucky loser
 r = Retired

Finals

Earlier rounds

Section 1

Section 2

References

External links
 1944 U.S. National Championships on ITFtennis.com, the source for this draw

Men's Singles
1944